Harry Barker may refer to:

Harry Barker Reserve, a cricket ground near Gisborne, New Zealand, named after a former mayor
Harry Barker (mayor) (1898–1994), mayor of Gisborne, New Zealand
Harry Barker (business)

See also
Harold Barker (disambiguation)
Henry Barker (disambiguation)